The Ex-Wives Club was a 2007 American reality television program hosted by Shar Jackson and Marla Maples and Angie Everhart.

It focused on the hosts helping regular people as they get over painful and difficult divorces. Self-help author Debbie Ford also appeared on the show as a life coach.

It was produced by Glassman Media and premiered on ABC on May 28, 2007. It was cancelled on June 25, 2007.

References

External links

2000s American reality television series
2007 American television series debuts
2007 American television series endings
American Broadcasting Company original programming